Fixed drug reactions,  are common and so named because they recur at the same site with each exposure to a particular medication. Medications inducing fixed drug eruptions are usually those taken intermittently.

Signs and symptoms
A painful and itchy reddish/purple patch of skin that occurs in the same location with repeated exposures to the culprit drug is the classic presentation of a fixed drug reaction. The lips, genitals, and hands are often involved.

Cause
Medications that are commonly implicated as a cause of fixed drug eruptions include the following:
Cetirizine
Ciprofloxacin
Clarithromycin
Cotrimoxazole
Doxycycline
Fluconazole
NSAIDs (e.g., ibuprofen, etoricoxib, naproxen)
Phenytoin
Pseudoephedrine
Trimethoprim

See also 
 Drug eruption
 List of cutaneous conditions
 List of human leukocyte antigen alleles associated with cutaneous conditions
 Stevens–Johnson syndrome

References

External links 

 

Drug eruptions